Mikaela Loach (born 1998) is a climate justice activist based in Edinburgh in Scotland who has been nominated for the Global Citizen Prize: UK's Hero Award.

Loach is a medical student at the University of Edinburgh who uses her Instagram platform of over 100,000 to work towards making the climate movement more inclusive, focusing on the intersections of the climate crisis with human rights issues such as white supremacy and maltreatment of migrants.

Alongside Jo Becker, Loach is the co-producer, writer and presenter of the YIKES podcast which explores climate change, human rights and social justice.

Early life and education 
Loach was born in Jamaica to a British father and Jamaican mother, and was brought up in Surrey, United Kingdom. Loach moved to Edinburgh for university and is currently a 4th year medical student at the University of Edinburgh.

Campaigning 
As a teenager, Loach started to become aware of the intersection between environmental and racial justice. In 2019, Loach became a member of the environmental movement, Extinction Rebellion (XR) and in October 2019 travelled from Edinburgh to London to take part in the XR protests to demand politicians listen and act on the climate crisis. She kept a diary of her experiences. At the 2019 XR protest, Loach locked herself to an Extinction Rebellion Scotland stage in attempt to block police from clearing the protest. She was locked to the stage for approximately eight hours before she, and the other locked-on protesters voluntarily released themselves. Loach also campaigns with Climate Camp Scotland.

Speaking to the BBC, Loach said of her motivation:"I have been changing things in my lifestyle for a long time to try and be more eco-friendly but I had a realisation a few months ago that it doesn't matter if I go vegan or zero-waste if the government doesn't do anything. There need to be big structural changes."Loach states that she first started going to marches "when the refugee crisis was all over the news a few years ago. I got really into migrant and refugee rights and volunteered in the camp in Calais.... But then one day I realised that these things were really interconnected: the climate crisis is connected to the refugee crisis, and they are both also connected to racial injustice and the legacies of colonialism”

Through her social media, and as a writer for Eco-Age, Loach advocates for environmental justice, racial justice, sustainable fashion, and refugee rights. She has also been a guest on several podcasts, including Andrea Fox's Age of Plastic podcast, and Layla Saad's Good Ancestor Podcast. Loach was a speaker at Zurich's Youth Against Carbon Conference. In 2020, Loach created the YIKES podcast with Jo Becker.

For her activism work, Loach was named on BBC's Woman's Hour Power List.

In 2021 Loach began taking the UK government to court for using  taxpayers’ money to fund oil and gas companies.

References 

Scottish bloggers
Scottish women bloggers
Women podcasters
Climate activists
Scottish women activists
Jamaican women activists
Jamaican activists
Scottish activists
1998 births
Living people